Aleksander Hirschberg (1847–1907) was a Polish historian.

References
 Biogramy uczonych polskich, Część I: Nauki społeczne, zeszyt 1: A-J, Wrocław 1983

1847 births
1907 deaths
Writers from Lviv
19th-century Polish historians
Polish male non-fiction writers